Pectis longipes, the longstalk cinchweed, is a summer blooming perennial plant and is a genus of pectis. Its floral region is in the US states of Arizona and New Mexico.

References

longipes
Flora of North America